Maidan is an originally Persian  word for a town square or public gathering place, adopted by various other languages: Urdu  (maidān); Arabic  (maydān);  Turkish ; Bangla ময়দান, meaning field, and Crimean Tatar, from which Ukrainian also borrowed . Its ultimate source is Proto-Indo-European  - compare Avestan , Sanskrit  and Latin . Various versions include maydan, midan, meydan, majdan,  mayadeen and maydān.  It also means field (मैदान) in Hindi. It became a loanword in other South Asian languages to give similar means, such as in Tamil in which the word is maidhanam.

The broad geographical footprint of the use of Maidan in toponymy, from Central Europe to South-East Asia, is a reflection of the Turkish rule in these areas.

Places

In the Persian and Central Asian space
Maidaan-e naqsh-e jehaan or Naqsh-e Jahan Square, a square in the centre of Isfahan, Iran
Towns and villages in Iran: 

Meydan, Fars, Fars Province
Meydan, Ilam, Ilam Province
Meydan, Baft, Kerman Province
Meydan, Rabor, Kerman Province
Meydan, Harsin, Kermanshah Province
Meydan, Kermanshah, Kermanshah Province
Meydan, Sonqor, Kermanshah Province
Meydan, Khuzestan, Khuzestan Province
Meydan, Dorud, Khuzestan Province
Meydan, Kohgiluyeh and Boyer-Ahmad
Meydan-e Mozaffarkhan, Kurdistan
Meydan, West Azerbaijan
Meydan-e Olya, West Azerbaijan Province
Meydan-e Sofla, West Azerbaijan Province
Meydan Khalaf
Meydan Tarreh Barahvaz
Meydan Jiq, Malekan
Meydan-e Bozorg, Lorestan Province
Meydanlar, East Azerbaijan Province
Meydan-e Khodaverdi
Meydan-e Tafalli
Ban Meydan-e Abdollah
Chal Meydan
Eslamabad-e Sar Meydan
Kalateh-ye Meydan
Qaleh Meydan (disambiguation), various places
Qezelejah Meydan
Sang Dar Meydan (disambiguation), various places
Sarmeydan (disambiguation), various places
Soltan Meydan
Tak Meydan

Meydan, Afghanistan, village in Balkh Province in northern Afghanistan
Maydan, Kyrgyzstan, a town in Kyrgyzstan
Maidan Shar, the capital of Wardak province, Afghanistan
Mehraneh river (Meydan Chayi), a river in Tabriz, Iran
Tavisuplebis Moedani or Freedom Square, Tbilisi, the central square of Tbilisi, Georgia

In South Asia and Southeast Asia
Maidan (Tirah), a remote valley in Khyber District, Khyber Pakhtunkhwa, Pakistan
Maidan, Nepal, a municipality in southern Nepal
Maidan, Lower Dir District, a valley in Lower Dir District, Khyber Pakhtunkhwa, Pakistan
Asramam Maidan, the first airport of Kerala state, in Kollam, India
Medan, Indonesia - capital city of North Sumatra province
Lal Bahadur Shastri Stadium, Hyderabad, India, originally named Fateh Maidan ("Victory Square")
Maidan (Kolkata), India, also referred to as the Brigade Parade Ground

In the former Ottoman / Mamluk space
Meydan, Gölbaşı, a village in the district of Gölbaşı, Adıyaman Province, Turkey
Meydan, Kurucaşile, a village in the district of Kurucaşile, Bartın Province, Turkey
Sultanahmet Square (Sultanahmet Meydanı), formerly Atmeydanı ("Horse Square"), in the center of Istanbul, Turkey
Taksim Meydanı or Taksim Square, another central public square in Istanbul, Turkey
Midan at-Tahrir or Tahrir Square, the central public space of Cairo, Egypt
the esplanade formerly known as Maydan or Hippodrome outside the Cairo Citadel
Majdan (Novi Kneževac), a village in North Banat District, Vojvodina province, Serbia
Meidan Ekbis, a small town in Syria
Al-Midan, neighbourhood and municipality in Damascus, Syria
Maydan al Shajara, a town square in Benghazi, Libya
Tašmajdan Park, a major public space in Belgrade, Serbia
Dubai Meydan City, United Arab Emirates
Meydan Racecourse, a horse racetrack
Entisar Tower (Meydan Tower), skyscraper to be built in the city
Maidan, the Romanian name for Majdanpek in Serbia
Mïdän at Taḥrǐr or Tahrir Square, Alexandria, Egypt
Tahrir Square, Sanaa, or Maidan at-Tahrir, in Sanaa, Yemen

In Poland
Poland took up the word majdan from its numerous exchanges with the Ottoman and other Persianate-influenced cultures.

Majdan, Gmina Wojsławice in Lublin Voivodeship
Majdan, Gmina Żmudź in Lublin Voivodeship
Majdan, Hrubieszów County in Lublin Voivodeship
Majdan, Janów Lubelski County in Lublin Voivodeship
Majdan, Białystok County in Podlaskie Voivodeship
Majdan, Hajnówka County in Podlaskie Voivodeship
Majdan, Suwałki County in Podlaskie Voivodeship
Majdan, Tomaszów Lubelski County in Lublin Voivodeship
Majdan, Lesko County in Subcarpathian Voivodeship
Majdan, Garwolin County in Masovian Voivodeship
Majdan, Mińsk County in Masovian Voivodeship
Majdan, Ostrołęka County in Masovian Voivodeship
Majdan, Otwock County in Masovian Voivodeship
Majdan, Gmina Łochów in Masovian Voivodeship
Majdan, Gmina Stoczek in Masovian Voivodeship
Majdan, Gmina Wierzbno in Masovian Voivodeship
Majdan, Wołomin County in Masovian Voivodeship
Majdan, Warmian-Masurian Voivodeship

In Romania
Maidan, a village in Cacica Commune, Suceava County 
Maidan, the former name of Brădișoru de Jos village, Oravița Town, Caraș-Severin County

In Ukraine 

Maidan Nezalezhnosti (Майдан Незалежності) or Independence Square, the central square of Kyiv
Maidan Nezalezhnosti, a metro station on line M2
Maidan Konstytutsii (Kharkiv Metro), or Constitution Square, a metro station in Kharkiv
Maidan Pratsi (Kryvyi Rih Metrotram)
Staryi Maidan, village in Khmelnytskyi Raion, Khmelnytskyi Oblast
Viche Maidan (Ivano-Frankivsk), a city square
Maidan, a village in Berehomet rural hromada, Vyzhnytsia Raion, Chernivtsi Oblast
Maidan, a village in Vyzhnytsia urban hromada, Vyzhnytsia Raion, Chernivtsi Oblast
Maidan, a village in Tysmenytsia Raion, Ivano-Frankivsk Oblast

Other uses in Ukraine 

 Maidan (2014 film)
 Maidan People's Union, political party
 Euromaidan
 Anti-Maidan
 Anti-Maidan (Russia)
 AutoMaidan
 February 2014 Maidan revolution
 Orange Revolution (sometimes referred to as a Maidan revolution)

See also 

 Majdany, the plural form of Majdan.

Notes

Place names